Oğulpaşa can refer to:

 Oğulpaşa, Havsa
 Oğulpaşa, Osmaneli